Misery Mountain, with at least ten well-defined summits, is a prominent  long ridgeline in the Taconic Mountains of western Massachusetts and adjacent New York. The west side of the mountain is located in New York; the east side and high point lie within Massachusetts. The summit ridge is part meadow and part wooded with red spruce, balsam fir, and northern hardwood tree species. It is notable for its views of the Hudson River Valley to the west. The  Taconic Crest Trail traverses the crest of the ridgeline, but does not cross the summit.

Geography
The subordinate summits of Misery Mountain do not have names with the exception of the southernmost peak,  referred to as Bill's Lunch in popular hiking guides. Portions of the upper slopes and summit are within protected conservation land.

Misery Mountain is located within the New York towns of Stephentown and Berlin and the Massachusetts towns of Hancock and Williamstown. The Taconic ridge continues south as Rounds Mountain and north as Berlin Mountain. Misery Mountain is flanked to the east by Brodie Mountain. The northwest side of Misery Mountain drains into the Little Hoosic River, thence into the Hoosic River, the Hudson River, and New York Harbor. The southwest side drains into West Brook, Kinderhook Creek, thence the Hudson River; the southeast side into Kinderhook Creek. The northeast side drains into the West Branch of the Green River, the Green River, thence the Hoosic River.

References
 Massachusetts Trail Guide (2004). Boston: Appalachian Mountain Club.

References

External links
 Berkshire Natural Resource Council.
 Rensselaer Land Trust. 
 Hopkins Memorial Forest map. 
 Hopkins Memorial Forest history 
 Taconic Hiking Club
 Williamstown Rural Lands Foundation
 Williamstown Rural Lands Foundation trail map

Mountains of Berkshire County, Massachusetts
Taconic Mountains
Mountains of Rensselaer County, New York
Mountains of New York (state)